The Tritones are an a cappella co-ed group from the University of California, San Diego.  The group was founded in 1996 and is the first of nine a cappella groups on the campus. The group is composed of 14-22 undergraduate and graduate students from the university and sings a variety of genres, from jazz to Top 40's. The Group frequently competes in the International Championship of Collegiate A Cappella.

The Tritones have performed alongside Taylor Swift at the 2010 Country Music Awards and opened for the Far East Movement. On their sophomore EP release, "Seven Nation Army" received a nomination for a CARA Award by the Contemporary A Cappella Society.

Recordings
The Tritones have recorded multiple albums, released EPs on iTunes in 2011 and 2012, and a full-length album in 2015.

Augment - EP
 "Haven't Met You Yet" (Michael Bublé)
 "You Belong With Me" (Taylor Swift)
 "Teenage Dream" (Katy Perry)
 "Speechless" (Lady Gaga)
 "Teenage Dream" (Katy Perry)

Take My Heart - EP
 "Seven Nation Army" (The White Stripes)
 "Someone Like You" (Adele)
 "Perfect" (P!nk)
 "My Heart With You" (The Rescues)
 "Domino" (Jessie J)

Out of Control
 "Pumped Up Kicks" (Foster The People)
 "This is How We Roll" (Florida Georgia Line)
 "Drake Medley" (Drake)
 "Carry On" (Fun)
 "The A Team" (Ed Sheeran)
 "Neighborhood Punks" (Daft Punk & The Neighbourhood)
 "Rather Be" (Clean Bandit)

External links
UCSD Tritones Website

Notes

University of California, San Diego
Collegiate a cappella groups
Musical groups established in 1996